Charmed: The Soundtrack is the debut soundtrack album of the television series Charmed, which aired on The WB in the United States. It features music from the show's first five seasons and was released on September 22, 2003 by BMG Music.

Background and release
Charmed: The Soundtrack was produced by Harry Brainerd, Jonathan Platt and Jonathan Scott Miller. The soundtrack is made up mostly of tracks by little-known artists, though some better known ones, such as Goldfrapp and Stereophonics, are also featured. It also includes Charmeds theme song, a cover of The Smiths 1985 song "How Soon Is Now?" by Love Spit Love. A partial edition of Charmed: The Soundtrack was released as a worldwide digital download on September 22, 2003 by BMG Music. The full edition was released as a CD in the United States on September 23, 2003 and in the United Kingdom on September 29, 2003.

Johnny Loftus of AllMusic gave Charmed: The Soundtrack three stars out of five and wrote that it "is just a milky collection of light modern rock from a mixture of heavyweights and hopefuls." Loftus also noted that "the real standout" on the soundtrack is Rachael Yamagata's song "Worn Me Down". On October 11, 2003, Charmed: The Soundtrack debuted at number 177 on the US Billboard 200 chart and number 10 on the US Billboard Top Soundtracks chart.

Track listing

Charts

Release history

References

Charmed (TV series)
2003 soundtrack albums
RCA Records soundtracks
Television soundtracks